A Benjamin tree is a type of tree which produces benzoin or has similar properties. It may refer to the following species:

 Ficus benjamina, native to Asia and Australia
 Lindera benzoin, native to North America
 Styrax benzoin, native to Sumatra